The Soviet evacuation of Tallinn, also called Juminda mine battle, Tallinn disaster or Russian Dunkirk, was a Soviet operation to evacuate the 190 ships of the Baltic Fleet, units of the Red Army, and pro-Soviet civilians from the fleet's encircled main base of Tallinn in Soviet-occupied Estonia during August 1941. Near Juminda peninsula Soviet fleet ran into minefield that had been laid by the Finnish and German navies, and were repeatedly attacked by aircraft and torpedo boats, suffering massive losses.

Background
Soviet forces had occupied Estonia in June 1940. After the German invasion of the Soviet Union began on 22 June 1941, German forces advanced rapidly through the Soviet-occupied Baltic countries, and by the end of August the Estonian capital of Tallinn was surrounded by German forces, while a large part of the Red Banner Baltic Fleet was bottled up in Tallinn harbour.

In expectation of a Soviet breakout, the Kriegsmarine and the Finnish Navy had started on 8 August 1941 to lay minefields off Cape Juminda on the Lahemaa coast. While Soviet minesweepers tried to clear a path for convoys through the minefields, German coastal artillery installed a battery of  guns near Cape Juminda and the Finnish navy gathered their 2nd Motor Torpedo Boat Flotilla with patrol boats VMV9, VMV10, VMV11 and VMV17. At the same time the German 3. Schnellbootflottille with E-boats S-26, S-27, S-39, S-40 and S-101 was concentrated at Suomenlinna outside Helsinki. German Junkers Ju 88 bombers from Kampfgruppe 806 based on airfields in Estonia were put on alert. On 19 August the final German assault on Tallinn began.

During the night of 27/28 August 1941 the Soviet 10th Rifle Corps disengaged from the enemy and boarded transports in Tallinn.

The embarkation was protected by smoke screens, however, the mine-sweeping in the days before the evacuation began was ineffective due to bad weather, and there were no Soviet aircraft available for protecting the embarkation. This, together with heavy German shelling and aerial bombardment killed at least 1,000 of the evacuees in the harbour.

Gauntlet in the Gulf of Finland

Twenty large transports, eight auxiliary ships, nine small transports, a tanker, a tug, and a tender were organized into four convoys, protected by the Soviet cruiser Kirov, with Admiral Vladimir Tributs on board, two flotilla leaders, nine destroyers, three torpedo boats, twelve submarines, ten modern and fifteen obsolete minehunters, 22 minesweepers, 21 submarine chasers, three gun boats, a minelayer, thirteen patrol vessels and eleven torpedo boats.

On 28 August Luftwaffe bomber wing Kampfgeschwader 77 (KG 77) and KGr 806 sank the 2,026 grt steamer Vironia, the 2,317 grt Lucerne, the 1,423 grt Atis Kronvalds and the 2,250 grt ice breaker Krisjanis Valdemars. The rest of the Soviet fleet were forced to change course. This took them through a heavily mined area. As a result, 21 Soviet warships, including five destroyers, struck mines and sank. On 29 August, the Luftwaffe, now reinforced with KG 76, KG 4 and KG 1, accounted for the transport ships Vtoraya Pyatiletka (3,974 grt), Kalpaks (2,190 grt) and Leningradsovet (1,270 grt) sunk. In addition, the ships Ivan Papanin, Saule, Kazakhstan and the Serp i Molot were damaged by I./KG 4, which also sank three more. Some 5,000 Soviet soldiers died.

Later that evening the armada was attacked by Finnish and German torpedo boats, and the chaotic situation made organized mine sweeping impossible. Darkness fell at 22:00 and the Soviet armada stopped and anchored at midnight in the heavily mined water.

Early on 29 August Ju 88 bombers attacked the remains of the convoys off Suursaari, sinking two transports. Meanwhile, the undamaged ships made best speed to reach the safety of the Kronstadt batteries. The heavily damaged merchant ship Kazakhstan disembarked 2300 men of the 5000 on board before steaming on to Kronstadt. In the following days ships operating from Suursaari rescued 12,160 survivors.

The Soviet evacuation of Tallinn succeeded in evacuating 165 ships, 28,000 passengers and 66,000 tons of equipment. A total of 84 vessels were sunk or damaged irrepairable. At least 12,400 are thought to have drowned in circumstances little known outside the former Soviet Union. The event was long downplayed by the Stalinist regime after the war. The evacuation may have been the bloodiest naval disaster since the Battle of Lepanto.

On 25 August 2001, a memorial was unveiled at Juminda.

Partial list of sunk ships

Passenger ship SS Vironia - hit a mine off Cape Juminda and sank in 5 minutes. 1300 people lost their lives.
Cargo ship SS Eestirand /VT-532 - attacked and damaged by German bombers and was beached in Prangli island. At least 44 people died in the initial attack.
Submarine S-5 - 28 August 1941, Gulf of Finland
Submarine Shch-301 - 28 August 1941, off Cape Juminda
Destroyer Yakov Sverdlov - 28 August 1941, off Mohni island
Destroyer Kalinin - 28 August 1941, off Cape Juminda
Destroyer Artem - 28 August 1941, off Cape Juminda
Destroyer Volodarski - 28 August 1941, off Cape Juminda
Destroyer Skory - 28 August 1941, off Cape Juminda
Patrol vessel Sneg - 28 August 1941, off Cape Juminda
Patrol vessel Tsiklon - 28 August 1941, off Cape Juminda
Gunboat I-8 - 28 August 1941, off Cape Juminda
Minesweeper No. 71 (Crab) - 28 August 1941, off Cape Juminda
Minesweeper No. 42 (Lenvodput-13) - 28 August 1941, off Cape Juminda
Everita (3251grt) - Transport with around 1,570 soldiers on board, sank a minute after the explosion. No more than ten people rescued.
VT-530/Ella (1522grt) - Soviet passenger ship struck a mine and sank in the Baltic Sea off Cape Juminda. Her captain and 643 crew and passengers killed.

See also
List of shipwrecks in August 1941

References

Literature 
 Bergstrom, Christer (2007a). Barbarossa - The Air Battle: July–December 1941. London: Chevron/Ian Allan. .
 Mati Õun: Juminda miinilahing 1941 – maailmasündmus meie koduvetes (Juminda sea battle 1941 – an event of the world in our seas), Juminda Sentinel, Juminda, 2006, . (Estonian)

Conflicts in 1941
Eastern Front (World War II)
1941 in Estonia
1941 in the Soviet Union
Baltic Sea operations of World War II
Operation Barbarossa
Naval battles of World War II involving the Soviet Union
Naval battles of World War II involving Germany
Evacuations
20th century in Tallinn
August 1941 events
Naval battles of World War II involving Finland